The Bishop of Ripon was a diocesan bishop's title which took its name after the city of Ripon in North Yorkshire, England.

History 

Though one ancient Bishop of Ripon is known - Eadhæd, who served in the late 7th century - the modern see of Ripon was established in 1836 from parts of the dioceses of Chester and York. In the same year, the collegiate church in Ripon was raised to the status of cathedral church. From 1905, the bishops of Ripon were assisted by the suffragan bishops of Knaresborough in overseeing the diocese. In 1999, the see changed its name to the Diocese of Ripon and Leeds, reflecting the growing importance of Leeds, the largest city within the diocese and one of the fastest-growing cities in Britain.The only bishop of Ripon and Leeds was John Packer, who signed John Ripon and Leeds, and retired on 31 January 2014.

The Diocese of Ripon and Leeds was dissolved on 20 April 2014 and its former territory was added to the new Diocese of Leeds. The suffragan title of Bishop of Knaresborough was then renamed to Bishop of Ripon, becoming an area bishop covering the northern part of the Diocese of Leeds. The first area Bishop of Ripon was James Bell, who had previously been the suffragan Bishop of Knaresborough, and acting diocesan Bishop of Ripon and Leeds until the dissolution of that diocese.

Palace 

A chapel was added in 1846-7.

In 1940, during World War II, this palace became a Barnardo's evacuation centre, with the bishops moving to a house nearby on Hutton Bank that was renamed Bishop Mount. This move was subsequently made permanent, and the old palace became Barnardo's Spring Hill School in 1950. The original palace was later divided into several residential dwellings.

In 2008, the diocesan bishop moved to Hollin House, a six-bedroom house in Weetwood, North Leeds. After the merger of the diocese of Ripon into the new Diocese of Leeds, this became the home of the Bishop of Leeds.

List of bishops

Assistant bishops
Among those who served as "Assistant Bishop of Ripon" were:
1883–1884: Isaac Hellmuth, former Bishop of Huron and friend to Bickersteth

References

 
Diocese of Ripon and Leeds
Diocese of Ripon